Ñadi is a type of soil and a phytogeographic zone of Southern Chile. Ñadi soils are located in the Chilean Central Valley of Los Lagos Region, specifically between the moraines left by the region's most recent glaciation (the Llanquihue glaciation) and those of the penultimate glaciation (the Santa María glaciation). Ñadis have an impermeable layer, usually called fierrillo. In more technical terms this layer is a placic horizon that is chiefly made up by the minerals goethite and ferrihydrite. Ñadi soils are found between the latitudes 38 to 43° S.

See also
Lahuen Ñadi Natural Monument
Trumao

References

Agricultural regions
Geography of Chile
Soil in Chile
Geography of Los Lagos Region
Geography of Los Ríos Region
Volcanic soils